Arms trafficking or gunrunning is the illicit trade of contraband small arms and ammunition, which constitutes part of a broad range of illegal activities often associated with transnational criminal organizations. The illegal trade of small arms, unlike other organized crime commodities, is more closely associated with exercising power in communities instead of achieving economic gain. Scholars estimate illegal arms transactions amount to over US$1 billion annually.

To keep track of imports and exports of several of the most dangerous armament categories, the United Nations, in 1991, created a Register for Conventional Arms. Participation, however, is not compulsory, and lacks comprehensive data in regions outside of Europe. Africa, due to a prevalence of corrupt officials and loosely enforced trade regulations, is a region with extensive illicit arms activity. In a resolution to complement the Register with legally binding obligations, a Firearms Protocol was incorporated into the UN Convention on Transnational Organized Crime, which requires states to improve systems that control trafficked ammunition and firearms.

The 1999 Report of the UN Panel of Governmental Experts on Small Arms provides a more refined and precise definition, which has become internationally accepted. This distinguishes between small arms (revolvers and self-loading pistols, rifles and carbines, submachine guns, assault rifles, and light machine guns), which are weapons designed for personal use, and light weapons (heavy machine guns, hand-held under-barrel and mounted grenade launchers, portable anti-aircraft guns, portable anti-tank guns, recoilless rifles, portable launchers of anti-aircraft missile systems, and mortars of calibres less than 100 mm), which are designed for use by several persons serving as a unit. Ammunition and explosives also form an integral part of small arms and light weapons used in conflict.

Impact

Areas
 
Although arms trafficking is widespread in regions of political turmoil, it is not limited to such areas, and for example, in South Asia, an estimated 63 million guns have been trafficked into India and Pakistan.

The suppression of gunrunning is one of the areas of interest in the context of international law. In the United Nations, there has been widespread support to implement international legislation to prevent arms trafficking, however, it has been difficult to implement, due to many different factors that allow for arms trafficking to occur.

In the United States, the term "Iron Pipeline" is sometimes used to describe Interstate Highway 95 and its connector highways as a corridor for arms trafficking into the New York City Metro Area.

Mexico

During the Mexican Revolution, gunrunning into Mexico reached rampant levels with the majority of the arms being smuggled from the United States. As Mexico manufactured no weapons of its own, acquiring arms and ammunition were one of the main concerns of the various rebels, intent on armed revolution. Under American law at the time, arms smugglers into Mexico could be prosecuted only if one was caught in flagrante delicto crossing the border as merely buying arms with the intention of gunrunning into Mexico was not a criminal offense. Given the length and often rugged terrain of the American-Mexican border, the undermanned American border service simply could not stop the massive gunrunning into Mexico.

In February 1913-February 1914, President Woodrow Wilson imposed an arms embargo on both sides of the Mexican civil war, and not until February 1914 was the embargo lifted on arms sales to the Constitutionalist rebels. Despite the arms embargo, there was much gunrunning into Mexico, as one American official complained in 1913: "our border towns are practically their commissary and quartermaster depots". Guns were smuggled into Mexico via barrels, coffins, and false bottoms of automobiles. General Huerta avoided the American arms embargo by buying weapons from Germany.

Africa

Liberia and Sierra Leone conflicts 
The civil war in Sierra Leone lasted from 1991–2002, and left 75,000 people dead. Gunrunning played a significant role in this conflict. Weapons of all sorts were shipped to all sides in both Sierra Leone, and Liberia from abroad. These included small arms, such as, pistols, assault rifles, grenades, Claymores, knives, machetes, etc. Larger weapons such as missiles, light machine guns, mortars, anti-tank missiles, tanks, and planes were also used. During this time a civil war was occurring in nearby Liberia. The Liberian Civil Wars took place from 1989 through 1997. The war was between the existing government and the National Patriotic Front. Leader of the National Patriotic Front of Liberia, Charles Taylor, helped to create the Revolutionary United Front (RUF) in Sierra Leone. Taylor was the recipient of thousands of illegally trafficked arms from eastern Europe (mostly Ukraine). Taylor then sold some of these weapons to the RUF in exchange for diamonds. President of Burkina Faso, Blaise Compaore, “directly facilitated Liberia’s arms-for-diamonds trade” with Liberia and Sierra Leone. Compaore would give guns to Taylor, who would then sell them to the RUF in exchange for diamonds. These blood diamonds would then be sold back to Compaore for more guns. The cyclical exchange allowed Compaore the ability to deny directly sending arms to Sierra Leone.

The Liberian government received arms through an elaborate front company in Guinea. The arms were intended to be shipped (legally) from Uganda to Slovakia. However, the arms were diverted to Guinea as a part of “an elaborate bait and switch.” Additionally the British government “encouraged Sandline International, a private security firm and non state entity, to supply arms and ammunitions to the loyal forces of the exiled government of President Kabbah.” Sandline proceeded 35 tons of arms from Bulgaria, to Kabbah's forces.

The South Sudanese civil war
Ever since the South Sudanese civil war began in December 2013, gunrunning into that nation has reached rampant levels. As South Sudan has hardly any electricity and no manufacturing, both sides were entirely dependent upon buying arms from abroad to fight their war. President Salva Kiir Mayardit used shadowy networks of arms dealers from China, Uganda, Israel, Egypt and Ukraine to arm his forces. As oil companies paid rent for their concessions in South Sudan, the government was able to afford to buy arms on a lavish scale. In June 2014, the government's National Security Service signed a deal worth $264 million US dollars with a Seychelles-based shell company to buy 30 tanks, 50,000 AK-47 assault rifles and 20 million bullets. The owner of the shell company currently remains unknown. In July 2014, the Chinese arms manufacturer Norinco delivered a shipment to South Sudan of 95,000 assault rifles and 20 million rounds of ammunition, supplying enough bullets to kill every person in South Sudan twice over. The American arms dealer and private military contractor, Erik Prince, sold to the government for $43 million dollars three Mi-24 attack helicopters and two L-39 jets together with the services of Hungarian mercenary pilots to operate the aircraft. The majority of the arms supplied to South Sudan from Uganda originated from Romania, Bulgaria and Slovakia, all which are members of the European Union (EU), and were supposed to abide by an EU arms embargo placed on South Sudan in 2011.   

Less is known about the very secretive arms dealers supplying the rebel Sudan People's Liberation Movement-in-Opposition (SPLM-IO) led by Riek Machar other than that the majority of the gunrunners appeared to be European. A rare exception was with the Franco-Polish arms dealer Pierre Dadak who was arrested on 14 July 2016 at his villa in Ibiza on charges of gunrunning into South Sudan. At his villa, the Spanish National Police Corps allege that they found documents showing he was negotiating to sell Machar 40,000 AK-47 assault rifles, 30,000 PKM machine guns and 200,000 boxes of ammunition.

The United Nations Panel of Experts on South Sudan in a 2017 report declared: "Reports from independent sources indicate that the border areas between South Sudan and the Sudan and Uganda remain key entry points for arms, with some unsubstantiated reports of smaller numbers of weapons also crossing into South Sudan from the Democratic Republic of the Congo. There are also persistent reports and public accusations of shipments to forces affiliated with the leadership in Juba from further afield, specifically from Egypt". The same report stated that a Ukrainian Air Force IL-76 transport jet flew in two L-39 jets to Uganda on 27 January 2017 in the full knowledge the L-39 jets were intended to go on to South Sudan, thereby violating the arms embargo Ukraine had placed on arms sales to South Sudan. In 2018, the United Nations Security Council imposed a worldwide arms embargo on South Sudan, but the embargo has been widely ignored where despite a ceasefire signed the same year, both sides have continued to import arms on a massive scale, suggesting that they are preparing for another bout of the civil war.

Why traffickers choose Africa 
Kimberly Thachuk and Karen Saunders argue that arms trafficking is no different from any other illegal business in their work Under the Radar: Airborne Arms Trafficking Operations in Africa. Traffickers first need a headquarters, or somewhere to base their operations. A headquarters needs several aspects to make it an ideal place to traffic weapons. First, the headquarters should have appropriate infrastructure. For a weapons trafficking this would include a landing strip for both importation and exportation. Additionally, warehouses are needed to “store product awaiting delivery." Once the product has arrived and been stored it needs to be delivered to the customer, thus, the headquarters should be in somewhat of a central location near each customer. While not the primary reason traffickers choose Africa, it has multitudes of unoccupied land that can be used by traffickers, as is asserted by Thachuk and Saunders.

Physical space is important but the rules and regulations of said space are also relevant. Traffickers look for places with corrupt, supply side, officials that can either be bribed, or blackmailed. This allows the trafficker to “circumvent the regulatory and oversight systems” put in place by the government. Furthermore, a “lax financial system” is key so the large amounts of money moved by the trafficker are not seen as suspicious.

Thachuk and Saunders finish their argument, a stable, and highly centralized government, is important. They then point out that 10 different African countries have leaders that have been in power for more than 20 years, which they argue meets the criteria a highly centralized and stable government.

Europe 

Since 1996, countries throughout Europe have taken notice of arms trafficking. Europe has been an overall large exporter of illicit weapons with the United Kingdom, Germany, and France in the national lead for the most exports. Imports to Europe in from 2004–2013 have decreased by 25%, with the United Kingdom importing the most overall in Europe. The firearms that are imported and passed around are commonly small arms and lighter weapons (SALW) compared to large machinery, such as tanks and aircraft. The SALW bought in Europe tends to be secondhand weapons that are cheap and regularly available. Gun cultures, such as in Germany, where the "taken-for-granted cultural practice of carrying a handgun," increases illicit SALW because guns are viewed as a way to enhance masculinity and status. In 2000, the Organization for Security and Co-operation in Europe (OSCE) started on regional solutions and security measures to address the firearms trafficking problem.

Global market value
Though one of the least profitable illegal trades, arms trafficking made an estimated $1.7-3.5 billion in 2014, making it the 9th largest criminal market, which was valued at $1.6-2.2 trillion. 

The AK-47 is one of the most appealing weapons in the illegal weapons trade due to its low cost and reliability. In Iraq, a smuggled AK-47 typically costs $150–300. In the first sixth months of the 2003 invasion of Iraq, the influx of new weapons lowered the AK-47's price, to the point the weapon was sold for as low as $25, or sometimes, nothing. Comparatively, AK-47s sold on the Dark web in the United States can cost as much as $3,600, as the price of illegal arms is increased greatly by the distance it must travel, due to the induced risk. A handgun trafficked from the United States to Canada can have its price increase by 560% from just crossing the border. Weapons smuggled overseas will usually take several, short trips with multiple companies to mask the country of origin and the original sellers.

In the United States, biker gangs have been connected to arms trafficking. United States law enforcement agencies started investigating bike gangs in the late 90s, and started classifying them as organized criminal organizations. This was mainly due to the fact that they were able to get control of the prostitution market and the smuggling of stolen goods such as weapons, motorcycles, and car parts.

Regulation 
Prosecuting arms traffickers and brokers has proven difficult due to loopholes in national laws. In 2000, Israeli arms dealer Leonid Minin was arrested in Italy for drug possession, and while serving his sentence, Italian police found over 1,500 pages of forged end-user certificates and transfers of money which implicated him in trafficking arms to the Revolutionary United Front in Sierra Leone. Minin was released in December 2002, as according to Italian law, he could not be tried because the weapons he had sold had never reached Italy. Additionally, some arms dealers will operate in countries where they cannot be extradited. Arms traffickers are also able to evade capture due to a lack of co-operation between nations, especially in Africa and ex-Soviet states.

Related theories 
In the international criminal scholarly community, rational choice theory is commonly referenced in explanations as to why individuals engage in and justify criminal activity. According to Jana Arsovska and Panos Kostakos, leading scholars on organized crime, the causes of arms trafficking are not solely based on rational choice theory but rather have been more closely linked to the intimacy of one's personal social networks as well as the "perception of risks, effort and rewards in violating criminal laws."

In popular culture

Film
Lord of War (2005), a crime war film in which Nicolas Cage plays a fictional arms dealer named Yuri Orlov, who was based on the real Viktor Bout. The film was endorsed by Amnesty International for highlighting arms trafficking. Lord of War's DVD release featured Making a Killing: Inside the International Arms Trade, a 15-minute documentary about arms trafficking.
War Dogs (2016), a dark comedy drama biographical film based on the true story of two young men, David Packouz and Efraim Diveroli, who won a $300 million contract from the Pentagon to arm America's allies in Afghanistan and later became involved in arms trafficking.

Television
Sons of Anarchy, a crime drama about a fictional outlaw motorcycle club whose main source of income is trafficking arms to a variety of criminal enterprises domestically and internationally.
Jormungand, an anime television series based on the manga series by Keitarō Takahashi, focused on an illicit arms dealer and her child soldier bodyguard.

See also
 Annie Larsen affair
Arms Crisis
Arms control
 ATF gunwalking scandal (Operation Fast and Furious)
Argentine arms trafficking scandal
Cherbourg Project
Cement Incident
Coventry Four
Cuban packages
Chong Chon Gang
Conflict Armament Research
Francop Affair
Guns for Antigua
Howth gun-running
International Action Network on Small Arms
Iran–Contra affair
Karine A affair
Larne gun-running
List of illegal arms dealers
List of most-produced firearms
MV Karagatan incident
Operation Balak
Operation Velvetta
Operation Full Disclosure
 Provisional Irish Republican Army arms importation
 Purulia arms drop case
Polish arms sales to Republican Spain
Santorini affair
SS Libau
SS John Grafton
 Small Arms Survey
Transporte Aéreo Rioplatense
United States v. Curtiss-Wright Export Corp
Victoria Affair

References

External links 
 
 
 
 
 

 
Arms control
Firearm commerce
Illegal occupations
Gun politics
Organized crime activity
Small arms
Organized crime